Sphex flavovestitus is a species of thread-waisted wasp in the family Sphecidae.

Subspecies
These two subspecies belong to the species Sphex flavovestitus:
 Sphex flavovestitus flavovestitus F. Smith, 1856
 Sphex flavovestitus saussurei (Fernald, 1906)

References

Sphecidae
Articles created by Qbugbot
Insects described in 1856